Events in the year 1621 in Spain.

Incumbents
Monarch: Philip III until March 31, Philip IV since March 31

Events
August 10 - Eighty Years' War: Battle of Gibraltar (1621)
September 5 - Thirty Years' War: beginning of the Siege of Jülich

Births

Deaths
March 31 - Philip III (born 1578)

 
1620s in Spain